Luckock is a surname. Notable people with the surname include:

Herbert Mortimer Luckock (1833–1909), British Anglican priest
Russell Mortimer Luckock (1877–1950), British Army colonel
Rae Luckock (1893–1972), Canadian feminist, social justice activist and peace activist